Planchez is a commune in the Nièvre department in central France.

History
In World War II, during the German occupation of France, the area around Planchez was a focus for the Maquis. On 25 June 1944, as a collective punishment, the village was burned by German forces.

Demographics
On 1 January 2019, the estimated population was 301.

See also
Communes of the Nièvre department
Parc naturel régional du Morvan

References

Communes of Nièvre